Mornese is a comune (municipality) in the Province of Alessandria in the Italian region Piedmont, located about  southeast of Turin and about  southeast of Alessandria.

Mornese borders the following municipalities: Bosio, Casaleggio Boiro, Montaldeo, and Parodi Ligure.

See also 
 Parco naturale delle Capanne di Marcarolo

References

Cities and towns in Piedmont